Campanularia  is a genus of hydrozoans, in the family Campanulariidae.

Species
Campanularia abyssa Fraser, 1940
Campanularia africana Stechow, 1923
Campanularia agas Cornelius, 1982
Campanularia ambiplica Mulder & Trebilcock, 1914
Campanularia antarctica Ritchie, 1913
Campanularia brevicaulis Nutting, 1915
Campanularia breviscyphia Sars, 1857
Campanularia certidens Fraser, 1947
Campanularia compressima Kubota & Yamada, 1992
Campanularia costata (Gravier-Bonnet, 1979)
Campanularia crenata Allman, 1876
Campanularia denticulata Clark, 1877
Campanularia diverticulata (Totton, 1930)
Campanularia erythraea (Stechow, 1923)
Campanularia fusiformis Clark, 1876
Campanularia gaussica Stechow, 1923
Campanularia gracilis Allman, 1876
Campanularia groenlandica Levinsen, 1893
Campanularia hicksoni Totton, 1930 
Campanularia hincksii Alder, 1856
Campanularia indopacifica Stechow, 1919
Campanularia laminacarpa Millard, 1966
Campanularia lennoxensis Jäderholm, 1903
Campanularia macroscypha Allman, 1877
Campanularia morgansi Millard, 1957
Campanularia nodosa Stechow, 1923
Campanularia nuytsensis Watson, 2003
Campanularia pecten Gow & Millard, 1975
Campanularia pumila Bale, 1914
Campanularia pygmaea Clark, 1875
Campanularia retroflexa Allman, 1888
Campanularia roberti Gow & Millard, 1975
Campanularia sulcata Jäderholm, 1896
Campanularia tulipifera Allman, 1888
Campanularia volubilis (Linnaeus, 1758)

References

Campanulariidae
Hydrozoan genera
Bioluminescent cnidarians